Hylestad is a former municipality in the old Aust-Agder county in Norway. The  former municipality existed from 1915 until its dissolution in 1962. It was located in the southern part of the present-day municipality of Valle in the traditional region of Setesdal in Agder county. The administrative centre was the village of Rysstad where the Hylestad Church was located.

History
The parish of Hylestad was established as a municipality on 1 July 1915 when the municipality of Valle was divided into two municipalities: Hylestad (population: 658) in the south and Valle (population: 1,051) in the north. During the 1960s, there were many municipal mergers across Norway due to the work of the Schei Committee. On 1 January 1962, Hylestad was reincorporated into Valle. Prior to the merger Hylestad had a population of 662.

Name
The municipality (originally the parish) was named after the old Hylestad farm, since the first Hylestad Church was built there.

Government
All municipalities in Norway, including Hylestad, are responsible for primary education (through 10th grade), outpatient health services, senior citizen services, unemployment and other social services, zoning, economic development, and municipal roads. The municipality was governed by a municipal council of elected representatives, which in turn elected a mayor.

Municipal council
The municipal council  of Hylestad was made up of 13 representatives that were elected to four year terms.  The party breakdown of the final municipal council was as follows:

Notable residents
Osmund Faremo (1921-1999), a Norwegian politician
Aani Aanisson Rysstad (1894-1965), a Norwegian politician

See also
List of former municipalities of Norway

References

External links

Valle, Norway
Setesdal
Former municipalities of Norway
1915 establishments in Norway
1962 disestablishments in Norway